Bavarian War may refer to:

 Bavarian War (1420–1422), a conflict between Louis VII of Bavaria-Ingolstadt and Henry XVI of Bavaria-Landshut
 Bavarian War (1459–1463), a conflict between Albert Achilles of Brandenburg and Louis IX  of Bavaria-Landshut
 Landshut War of Succession, (1503-1505), a conflict between Albert IV of Bavaria-Munich and George of Bavaria-Landshut
 War of the Bavarian Succession (1778–1779), a conflict between the Habsburg Monarchy and a Saxon–Prussian alliance